The 2014 Archery World Cup was the 9th edition of the annual international archery circuit, organised by the World Archery Federation.

American Brady Ellison won the men's recurve competition for a record third time, beating 16-year-old Marcus D'Almeida in the final by shoot off. The winners in the other events were all from the Americas.

Competition rules and scoring
The compound legs consisted of a 50m qualification round of 72 arrows, followed by the compound round at 50m on a 6-zone target face, using cumulative scoring for all individual, team and mixed competitions. The top seven individual performers (with no more than two from each country,) plus one host nation representative if not already qualified, proceeded to the finals; the top mixed team performer proceeded to face the host nation at the finals, which were the same competition format as the legs. The team competition was not competed at the finals.

The recurve legs consisted of a 1440 qualification round (formerly called a FITA round), followed by a 72m Olympic set system. The top seven individual performers (with no more than two from each country), plus one host nation representative if not already qualified, proceeded to the finals; the top mixed team performer proceeded to face the host nation at the finals, which were the same competition format as the legs. The team competition was not competed at the finals.

The scores awarded in the four stages were as follows:

Individual scoring

Mixed team scoring

Hosts

Calendar

Results

Recurve

Men's individual

Women's individual

Men's team

Women's team

Mixed team

Compound

Men's individual

Women's individual

Men's team

Women's team

Mixed team

Medals table

Qualification

Recurve

Men's individual

1. Qualified but withdrew

Women's individual

1. Qualified but withdrew

Mixed team

Compound

Men's individual

1. Qualified but withdrew

Women's individual

Mixed team

Nations ranking

World Cup Final
With the exception of the highest ranked recurve archers Oh Jin-hyek and Jung Dasomi, the qualified athletes from South Korea declined invitations to the World Cup Final in order to focus on the Asian Games, and were replaced by the next highest qualifiers. The final places were filled by representatives from the host nation, Switzerland.

Recurve

Men's individual

Women's individual

Mixed team

Compound

Men's individual

Women's individual

Mixed team

References

External links
 Competition format 
 Competition rules 

Archery World Cup
World Cup
2014 in Chinese sport
2014 in Turkish sport
2014 in Colombian sport
2014 in Polish sport
2014 in Swiss sport
International archery competitions hosted by Turkey
International archery competitions hosted by Colombia
International archery competitions hosted by Switzerland
International archery competitions hosted by China
International archery competitions hosted by Poland
Sports competitions in Shanghai
Sport in Antalya
21st century in Antalya
Sport in Medellín
Sport in Wrocław
Sports competitions in Lausanne